Deedee, DeeDee or Dee Dee may refer to:

Given name 

 DeeDee Halleck (born 1940), American media activist
 DeeDee Jonrowe (born 1953), American kennel owner and dog musher, three-time runner up in the Iditarod Trail Sled Dog Race
 Deedee Magno (born 1975), American actress and singer

Nickname 

 Dee Dee Bridgewater (born 1950), American jazz singer and songwriter
 Deedee Corradini (1944–2015), mayor of Salt Lake City, Utah
 D'Andre Hill (born 1973), American track and field coach and former sprinter
 Dolores "Dee Dee" Kenniebrew (born 1945), American singer, member of the Crystals
 Dee Dee Myers (born 1961), American political analyst and former White House Press Secretary for President Clinton
 DeeDee Trotter (born 1982), American sprinter
 Dee Dee Wood, American choreographer, particularly in the 1960s and '70s
 Ku Huen-chiu (谷軒昭), Hong Kong action choreographer and stunt coordinator sometimes credited as "Dee Dee" or "DeeDee"
 DeeDee, nickname for the Distant Dwarf planet 2014 UZ224
 DeeDee, nickname for Vedangi, also known as Ding Dongi.

Stage name 

 Dee Dee Phelps, American singer, songwriter and author born Mary Sperling, half of the 1960s duo Dick and Dee Dee
 Dee Dee Ramone (1951–2002), German-American songwriter and musician, founding member, songwriter and bassist for punk rock band the Ramones
 Dee Dee Sharp (born 1945), American R&B singer
 Dee Dee Warwick (1942–2008), American soul singer
 Dee Dee Wilde, a member of the British dance troupe Pan's People

Other 
 Dee D. Jackson (born 1954), English singer and musician
 Dee Dee, a fictional character from the animated television series Dexter's Laboratory

See also 
 DD (disambiguation)
 Dede (disambiguation)
 Dedee, a nickname
 Deede (disambiguation)
 Didi (disambiguation)

Lists of people by nickname